Commonly known as the Denmark Vesey House, the house located at 56 Bull Street in Charleston, South Carolina was for a long time thought to be the house once inhabited by black abolitionist Denmark Vesey. Vesey's home, listed as 20 Bull Street under the city's former numbering system, is now evidently gone. A nearby home, most likely built in the 1820 and currently numbered 56 Bull Street, was thought in the 1970s to have been the home of Denmark Vesey, and it was designated as a National Historic Landmark in 1976 by the Department of Interior.

(id=b1dA1_XQXogC&pg=PA83&lpg=PA83&dq=He+Shall+Go+Out+For+Free+Denmark+Vesey+56+Bull&source=web&ots=B9jS1vh4br&sig=E4CbozxNK81XiLPdXYwadjZCO2w&hl=en Douglas R. Egerton, He Shall Go Out Free: The Lives of Denmark Vesey], 2004, footnote 18, p. 83</ref> Vesey was hanged on July 2, 1822 and his body was never found. id=b1dA1_XQXogC&pg=PA83&lpg=PA83&dq=He+Shall+Go+Out+For+Free+Denmark+Vesey+56+Bull&source=web&ots=B9jS1vh4br&sig=E4CbozxNK81XiLPdXYwadjZCO2w&hl=en Egerton (2004), He Shall Go Out Free, footnote 18, p. 83]</ref> Despite these findings, the house has continued to be listed as a National Historic Landmark and is on the National Register of Historic Places.

The house described as the Vesey house is a single story wood-frame structure, oriented sideways to the street.  The narrow street facade has two windows, while the longer west side has a porch extending across the front portion, with a wider addition to the back.  Two doors enter the house from the porch.  The interior of the front portion has three rooms, one beside the other, and the rear addition has four more.

See also
List of National Historic Landmarks in South Carolina
National Register of Historic Places listings in Charleston, South Carolina

References

External links
 Denmark Vesey House, Charleston County (56 Bull St., Charleston), with 4 photos, at South Carolina Department of Archives and History

African-American history in Charleston, South Carolina
Houses in Charleston, South Carolina
National Historic Landmarks in South Carolina
Houses on the National Register of Historic Places in South Carolina
National Register of Historic Places in Charleston, South Carolina
Historic district contributing properties in South Carolina
Houses completed in the 19th century